William Armar was an Irish Anglican priest.

Armar was educated at Trinity College, Dublin, graduating B.A. in 1676 and M.A. in 1680. He was Precentor of Lisburn from 1693 to 1694; and Archdeacon of Connor from 1694 until 1707.

References

17th-century Irish Anglican priests
18th-century Irish Anglican priests
Archdeacons of Connor
Alumni of Trinity College Dublin